Francis Pigou (3 January 1832 – 25 January 1916) was an Anglican priest in the second half of the 19th century and the early part of the 20th.

Career
He was born in Baden-Baden  and educated at Ripon Grammar School and Trinity College, Dublin. He was ordained in 1856 and became a Curate at St Andrew, Stoke Talmage, then Chaplain at Marbœuf Chapel, Paris. He held incumbencies at St Peter, Vere Street, St Philip, Regent Street and St George, Doncaster during which time he became an Honorary Chaplain to the Queen.

He was Rural Dean of Halifax from  1875 and held an honorary canonry in the Chapter of Ripon Cathedral. He was also chaplain to the 2nd West York Yeomanry Cavalry and to the Rifle Volunteers. In 1888 he became Dean of Chichester.

Pigou found life  to be unbearably sleepy in Chichester and  castigated it  unsparingly complaining that there was so little to do.

Family
On 3 January 1860 he married Mary, née Somers; they had two daughters. One daughter, Ernestine, was married to Alfred Inglis (1856–1919), who played cricket for Kent.

Mary died in 1868, and in January of the following year he married Harriet Maude, née Gambier.

Pigou died at Bristol on 25 January 1916.

References

External links
Bibliographic directory from Project Canterbury

1832 births
People from Baden-Baden
People educated at Ripon Grammar School
Alumni of Trinity College Dublin
Honorary Chaplains to the Queen
Deans of Chichester
Deans of Bristol
1916 deaths